Sachida Nand Sharma  is a politician who was one of the eight nominees of the Leader of the Opposition to the Senate of Fiji after the 2006 elections.  In March 2012 he was appointed the acting leader of the Fiji Labour Party.

References 

Fiji Labour Party politicians
Indian members of the Senate (Fiji)
Fijian politicians of Indian descent
Living people
Year of birth missing (living people)
Place of birth missing (living people)